Olba Aqueduct is a ruined Roman aqueduct in Mersin Province, southern Turkey.

The aqueduct was commissioned by the Roman emperor Septimius Severus (193–211) in 199. On the inscription it reads "the city of Olba residents". The aqueduct underwent repairs during the reign of Byzantine emperor Justinian I (527–565) in 566.

The aqueduct is mostly demolished. A part of it can be seen to the west of the agora ruins. It is a double tier aqueduct. There are observation towers around the aqueduct.

See also 
List of aqueducts in the Roman Empire
List of Roman aqueducts by date
Ancient Roman technology
Roman engineering

References

Roman aqueducts outside Rome
Aqueducts in Turkey
History of Mersin Province
Silifke District
Ruins in Turkey
Infrastructure completed in the 2nd century